Angelo Canevari (7 June 1901 – 1955) was an Italian painter. His work was part of the painting event in the art competition at the 1936 Summer Olympics.

References

1901 births
1955 deaths
20th-century Italian painters
Italian male painters
Olympic competitors in art competitions
People from Viterbo
20th-century Italian male artists